Year 492 (CDXCII) was a leap year starting on Wednesday (link will display the full calendar) of the Julian calendar. At the time, it was known as the Year of the Consulship of Anastasius and Rufus (or, less frequently, year 1245 Ab urbe condita). The denomination 492 for this year has been used since the early medieval period, when the Anno Domini calendar era became the prevalent method in Europe for naming years.

Events 
 By place 
 Byzantine Empire 
 Isaurian War: The Isaurians begin a revolt against Emperor Anastasius I in southern Central Anatolia.
 Battle of Cotyaeum: The Isaurian rebels are defeated by the Eastern Roman army, under John the Scythian and John the Hunchback (subordinate commanders include the future Justin I). They retreat to their mountain fortresses, and continue guerrilla warfare against the Roman forces until 497.

 Europe 
 King Theoderic the Great conquers Rimini, and brings his Ostrogoth fleet to blockade the harbours 6 miles from the capital of Ravenna. Important provisions, food and supplies are cut off, and the inhabitants are starved to death.

 By topic 
 Religion 
 March 1 – Pope Felix III dies after a 9-year reign in which he has excommunicated Patriarch Acacius of Constantinople, thus dividing the Western Church and Eastern Church (Acacian schism). He is succeeded by Gelasius I as the 49th pope.

Births

Deaths 
 March 1 – Pope Felix III 
 Xiao Ni, prince of Southern Qi (b. 444)

References